Torget is an island in Brønnøy Municipality in Nordland county, Norway. The  island lies just off shore from the town of Brønnøysund on the mainland. It is connected to Brønnøysund by the Brønnøysund Bridge.  There were 815 residents living on the island in 2015.

The mountain has a hole through the middle, so Torghatten is a popular tourist destination. It is estimated that there are on average about 100,000 visitors each year. Near Torghatten, there is a campsite where tourists can rent cabins or rent space for camping. There is also a small swimming area and a small restaurant right on the water. Previously, there was a restaurant further away from the bathing area that was severely damaged in a storm. Many tourists from, among others, Norway and Germany come to Torget to hike the mountain and see the hole going through it. The walk up to the hole takes place on a well-built path and takes about 20 minutes. If you go up one side, down the other side and around Torghatten it takes about 1 hour. Ice and water dug in the loose rocks painfully, while the harder rocks in the top of the mountain remained.

See also
List of islands of Norway

References

Brønnøy
Islands of Nordland